The Cidade de Guimarães Trophy is a soccer tournament played in the pre-season, hosted by Vitória de Guimarães.

Tournaments

2007

2008
The 2008 competition took place between 1 August and 3 August 2008 and featured Vitória de Guimarães, Benfica and Paris Saint-Germain. Benfica won in the final match against Vitória de Guimarães.

2009
The 2009 competition took place between 31 July and 2 August 2009 and featured Vitória de Guimarães, Benfica and Portsmouth. Benfica won in the final match against Vitória de Guimarães.

2010
The 2010 competition took place between 17 July and 19 July, and featured Vitória de Guimarães, Benfica and Groningen. Benfica won in the final match against Vitória de Guimarães.

2016

2017

Number of wins

References

Sport in Guimarães

Portuguese football friendly trophies